Ainderby Steeple is a village and civil parish in the Hambleton District of North Yorkshire, England.

History

The village is mentioned twice in the Domesday Book of 1086 as Eindrebi. Some of the lands were part of the manor of Northallerton at the time of the Norman Conquest which was held by Edwin, Earl of Mercia. After Edwin's rebellion of 1071, it became Crown property (indeed, the only Crown property in the entire Land of Count Alan). Most of the other land was in the manor of Ellerton-on-Swale, with land held by Thorkil and  Ulfkil before the Norman invasion, and Ansketil of Forneaux afterwards. The Funeaux family are recorded as lords of the manor thereafter until the early 14th century, when Geoffrey le Scrope bought the lands. The manor continued to be owned by his descendants, albeit with a couple of incidents when the Crown took possession, until 1517 when the eleventh Lord Scrope had no male heir. The manor was divided among his children, and ended up in the possession of Robert Roos by way of the Strangeway family. By the nineteenth century claims to the manor had fallen into abeyance.

The toponymy of the village is derived from the Old Norse personal name of Eindrithi and the word bi for farm with the addition of the Anglian word stēpel for steeple, giving Eindrithi's farm with a steeple.

Governance

The village lies within the Richmond UK Parliament constituency. It also lies within the Swale electoral division of North Yorkshire County Council and the Morton-on-Swale ward of Hambleton District Council.

The Parish boundary to the west of the village extends up to the outskirts of Morton-on-Swale and runs roughly north to south from a half mile north of the village to the south of Green Hills farm. The eastern boundary is formed by the River Wiske just one mile away and extends from just north of Barstow Hall farm to the outskirts of Warlaby. The northern boundary runs slightly north eastwards a half a mile from the A684. The neighbouring parishes consist of Yafforth, Romanby, Thrintoft, Morton-on-Swale and Warlaby.

Geography

The village lies on the A684 road between Northallerton and Bedale. It is situated less than a mile from the River Swale. How Beck, a tributary of the River Swale has its source on the southern outskirts of the village. The villages of Morton-on-Swale and Thrintoft are within a mile of the village. The Wensleydale Railway Association have extended their line, that currently runs from Redmire to Leeming Bar, to run just to the north of the village. This section was due to open to traffic in 2013 and will go as far the East Coast Main Line just to the west of Northallerton. This has meant the construction of two level crossings in the village.

Demography

2001 Census

The 2001 UK Census showed that the population was split 48.8% male to 51.2% female. The religious constituency was made of 82.1% Christian and the rest stating no religion or not stating at all. The ethnic make-up was 97.5% White British, 1.75% White other and 1.05% Indian British. There were 121 dwellings.

2011 Census

The 2011 UK Census showed that the population was split 48.7% male to 51.3% female. The religious constituency was made of 82.6% Christian, 0.3% Buddhist and the rest stating no religion or not stating at all. The ethnic make-up was 98.3% White British with the rest consisting of 0.3% each White Irish, White Other, Mixed White/Asian and Black British. There were 136 dwellings.

Community and culture

The village has a school, Ainderby Steeple CE Primary, which is within the catchment area of Northallerton School, which provides secondary education and sixth form facilities. The school is actually located on Station Road in neighbouring Morton-on-Swale. The village consists mainly of housing with one public house.

Religion

The Church of St Helen's, located in Ainderby Steeple, dates back to the fourteenth century. The parish registers start in 1668. It was Grade I listed in 1970 and was renovated in the 15th and 19th centuries.

Notable buildings

Howden Bridge over the River Wiske on the eastern boundary of the parish is a scheduled ancient monument.

References

External links 
 

Villages in North Yorkshire
Civil parishes in North Yorkshire